Wellington is a village in Lovejoy Township, Iroquois County, Illinois, United States. The population was 242 at the 2010 census.

Geography
Wellington is located in southeastern Iroquois County at  (40.541261, -87.680772). Illinois Route 1 passes less than a mile west of the village, leading north  to Watseka, the county seat, and south  to Hoopeston.

Demographics

As of the census of 2000, there were 264 people, 111 households, and 82 families residing in the village. The racial makeup of the village was 99.62% White and 0.38% Native American. Hispanic or Latino of any race were 1.89% of the population.

There were 111 households, out of which 25.2% had children under the age of 18 living with them, 62.2% were married couples living together, 7.2% had a female householder with no husband present, and 26.1% were non-families. 22.5% of all households were made up of individuals, and 7.2% had someone living alone who was 65 years of age or older.  The average household size was 2.38 and the average family size was 2.72.

In the village, the population was spread out, with 21.2% under the age of 18, 7.6% from 18 to 24, 27.7% from 25 to 44, 32.6% from 45 to 64, and 11.0% who were 65 years of age or older.  The median age was 41 years. For every 100 females, there were 97.0 males.  For every 100 females age 18 and over, there were 98.1 males.

The median income for a household in the village was $32,083, and the median income for a family was $35,000. Males had a median income of $30,250 versus $21,000 for females. The per capita income for the village was $17,324.  About 2.5% of families and 3.9% of the population were below the poverty line, including 6.6% of those under the age of eighteen and none of those 65 or over.

References

Villages in Iroquois County, Illinois
Villages in Illinois